South Roscommon was a UK Parliament constituency in Ireland, returning one Member of Parliament from 1885 to 1922.

Prior to the 1885 general election the area was part of the Roscommon constituency. From 1922, on the establishment of the Irish Free State, it was not represented in the UK Parliament.

Boundaries
This constituency comprised the southern part of County Roscommon. In 1918, the boundaries were redrawn to reflect transfers made under the 1898 Local Government Act between County Roscommon and County Galway, with the district electoral division of Rosmoylan being transferred into Roscommon, and part of the urban district of Ballinasloe being transferred into Galway.

1885–1918: The baronies of Athlone, Ballintober South, Ballymoe, Castlereagh and Moycarn, and that part of the barony of Roscommon contained within the parishes of Cloonfinlough and Kilbride and the townlands of Coggalkeenagh, Coggalmore, Coggalstack, Coggaltonroe and Coggalfortyacres in the parish of Lissonuffy.

1918–1922: The existing South Roscommon constituency (excluding the part contained within the administrative county of Galway), and that part of the existing North Galway constituency contained within the administrative county of Roscommon.

Members of Parliament

Elections

Elections in the 1880s

Elections in the 1890s

Hayden dies, causing a by-election.

Elections in the 1900s

Elections in the 1910s

References

Westminster constituencies in County Roscommon (historic)
Dáil constituencies in the Republic of Ireland (historic)
Constituencies of the Parliament of the United Kingdom established in 1885
Constituencies of the Parliament of the United Kingdom disestablished in 1922